"Who's Leaving Who" is a song written by Jack White and Mark Spiro, first recorded by Canadian country singer Anne Murray in 1986. It achieved bigger popularity in Europe when it was covered by British Hi-NRG singer Hazell Dean in 1988. David Hasselhoff covered the song on his 1991 album David, produced by Jack White.

Anne Murray version

The song was first recorded by Anne Murray for her Gold-plus 1986 album Something to Talk About. The song was released as the album's second single, following her Canadian and US number one country single, "Now and Forever (You and Me)". The single failed to reach the same level of success, peaking at number 93 on the Canadian singles chart, and failing to chart on the US Billboard Hot 100. Its biggest success was on the adult contemporary charts, peaking at number 15 in Canada and number 26 in the US.

Charts

Hazell Dean version

English singer Hazell Dean recorded a cover version of the song for her 1988 album, Always. The song was produced by Stock Aitken & Waterman and was reworked to suit Hazell Dean's music style as a Hi-NRG song. Released on March 21, 1988, the single surpassed the popularity of Murray's version and became Dean's biggest international success, peaking at number 4 in the UK and becoming her highest-charting single there, tied with her 1984 single "Whatever I Do (Wherever I Go)". It was her first top-40 hit in the UK in four years. When released around Europe, it also became a success, and it appeared on the US dance chart.

Critical reception
Johnny Dee from Record Mirror said, "Yes this record goes 'boom, chug-a-chug, chug, boom, chug-a-chug, chug." The magazine's James Hamilton wrote in his dance column, "Stock Aitken Waterman-produced thuddingly bounding 120bpm galloper with an attractive Eurobeat-ish lilt".

Impact and legacy
British magazine Classic Pop ranked the song number 14 in their list of Top 40 Stock Aitken Waterman songs in 2021, adding, "When PWL added their Hi-NRG motifs to Canadian country artist Anne Murray’s version of Who’s Leaving Who from two years earlier, the song took on ABBA-esque qualities that worked like a charm. Four years had passed for Hazell without much chart success, so when this put her into the Top 40, eventually climbing into the Top 5, things were looking up. The track appeared on Dean’s Always LP (which also features Turn It Into Love) and was her most successful release internationally.

Charts

Weekly charts

Year-end charts

References

1986 songs
1986 singles
1988 singles
Anne Murray songs
Hazell Dean songs
Song recordings produced by Stock Aitken Waterman
Songs written by Jack White
Songs written by Mark Spiro